Mikhail Viktorovich Gorbanevsky (born 21 May 1953, Chelyabinsk) is a Soviet and Russian linguist. His studies include general and Russian onomastics, toponymy and lexicology, forensic linguistic expertise, Slavic studies and speech culture, Russian language in computer technologies. He earned his Doctor of Philology in 1994. He became a Professor of the Department of General and Russian Linguistics of Peoples' Friendship University of Russia in 1996.

He served as vice president of the Society of Lovers of Russian Literature (1996). Chairman of the Board of the Guild of Linguistic Experts on Documentation and Information Disputes (2001). Member of the Union of Journalists of Russia (1985). He is a member of the International Federation of Journalists (IFJ).

He is a full member of the Russian Geographical Society (1977) and an Academician of the Russian Academy of Natural Sciences (2007).

References

External links 
 Осторожно: двери закрываются. Следующая станция —  Лубянка!
  Какие времена — такие и экспертизы

1953 births
Writers from Chelyabinsk
Living people
Soviet philologists
20th-century philologists
Russian philologists
Linguists from Russia
Russian opinion journalists
Russian studies scholars
Toponymists
Peoples' Friendship University of Russia alumni
Local historians